Enterprise Municipal Airport  is a city-owned, public-use airport located in Enterprise, a city in Wallowa County, Oregon, United States.

Facilities and aircraft 
Enterprise Municipal Airport covers an area of 10 acres (4 ha) at an elevation of 3,957 feet (1,206 m) above mean sea level. It has one runway designated 12/30 with an asphalt surface measuring 2,850 by 50 feet (869 x 15 m).

For the 12-month period ending April 27, 2009, the airport had 4,850 aircraft operations, an average of 13 per day: 91% general aviation and 9% air taxi. At that time there were 31 aircraft based at this airport: 87% single-engine and 13% ultralight.

See also 
 List of airports in Oregon

References

External links 
 Airport page at City of Enterprise website
 Aerial image as of June 1994 from USGS The National Map
 

Airports in Wallowa County, Oregon
Buildings and structures in Enterprise, Oregon